Bocholt is a city in the north-west of North Rhine-Westphalia, Germany, part of the district Borken. It is situated 4 km (2½ miles) south of the border with the Netherlands. Suderwick is part of Bocholt and is situated at the border annex to Dinxperlo.

Geography
The northern border of the city of Bocholt is the German border with the Netherlands. Bocholt borders the district of Wesel, in the administrative region of Düsseldorf, in the southwest.

Bocholt is bordered in the north by the Dutch municipalities of Aalten and Winterswijk, in the east by the city of Rhede, in the south by the city of Hamminkeln, and in the west by the city of Isselburg.

The climate in the region of Bocholt and West Münsterland is temperate with distinct maritime influences, with very mild winters in comparison to other German regions because of the proximity to the ocean and the low elevation. Summers are moderately warm. The average temperature in January is 2.7 °C (37 °F) and in July 18.4 °C (65 °F).

In the average year there are 12 days of snow cover, about 31 sunny days (high temperature of 25 °C; 77 °F or higher) and 6 hot days (30 °C; 86 °F or higher) on average. In the average year there is about 750 mm (30") of precipitation, with June (78 mm; 3") and April (41 mm; 1½") being the driest months.

History
Bocholt was first written about in 779, when Charlemagne won a battle against the Saxons nearby. However the settlement was probably much older. Bishop Dietrich III von Isenburg from Münster gave Bocholt city rights in 1222.

In the 15th century the city flourished. The engraver Israhel van Meckenem lived and worked in the city.

Between 1803 and 1810 Bocholt was the capital of the Principality of Salm. The Principality of Salm was governed by the prince of Salm-Salm and the prince of Salm-Kyrburg.

During the Second World War the city survived generally unscathed until an Allied bombing raid on 22 March 1945 which destroyed most of the city. The city was then captured by the British a week later on 28 March. The city was the site of the Stalag VI-F POW camp.

In 1975 the former municipalities Barlo, Biemenhorst, Hemden, Holtwick, Liedern, Lowick, Mussum, Spork, Stenern and Suderwick were merged into Bocholt.

Population development

 1871: 6,125
 1880: 8,534
 1890: 13,034
 1900: 21,278
 1910: 26,404
 1925: 30,182
 1933: 33,441
 1939: 35,099
 1945: 29,443
 1950: 37,674
 1961: 45,675
 1970: 48,852
 1980: 65,352
 1987: 67,028
 2000: 72,138
 2007: 73,560
 2010: 73,170
 2015: 71,443

Economy
Bocholt is a manufacturing town. It was  centered on the textile industry for most of the 19th and 20th centuries. Today there are still several successful textile manufacturers in town, but the importance of the textile industry has greatly declined. The major employers today in Bocholt are Gigaset (Communications) and Mechanical Drives (formerly Flender) (Siemens) - a leading manufacturer of transmissions, especially for wind energy plants. Most of Bocholt's industries are smaller and manufacture highly specialized products. Some of them are international leaders in their particular fields - A Good example is the bicycle company ROSE Bikes. Local industries profit from cooperation with the University of Applied Sciences (Fachhochschule) also located in Bocholt as well as with similar institutions in the region.

Bocholt is also a regional centre for shopping in the West-Münsterland area and draws consumers from the neighbouring rural and small town areas of the Netherlands. The town features an attractive old town shopping area as well as a popular new shopping mall.

Coat of arms
The coat of arms shows a beech tree, which has been the symbol for the city since the 13th century. Bocholt translated into English roughly means "beechwood".

Cyclists Bocholt
Bocholt is a designated bicycle city, and almost every citizen has one or more bikes, the bicycle network is vast and convenient. In the summer, foreign motorists need to take care because of the popularity of cycling in the city, and even in winter, many people travel only by bike. Group cycling tours, called "Pättkestouren", are particularly popular in the spring. Between 2005 and 2006 the city of Bocholt won the ADFC and BUND title of "most bicycle-friendly city in Germany" in the category of cities under 100,000 inhabitants. Bocholt is the first city in Germany to have a guarded bike station at a Bustreff and not at a railway station. A second bike station in Bocholt went into operation in 2008.

Transport
Bocholt is the last stop on a 25-minute 2-way-1-track train route starting in Wesel traveling north to Bocholt. From Wesel one can transfer to trains that travel south to Düsseldorf Airport, Düsseldorf Hauptbahnhof or northwest to Emmerich am Rhein or Arnhem in the Netherlands. In 2021 a new railway line between Bocholt and Düsseldorf main station started.

Notable people
 Melchior von Diepenbrock (1798–1853), 1845 Prince-Bishop of Breslau, 1848 Member of the Frankfurt Parliament, 1850 cardinal

 Jeanette Wolf (1888–1976), city council (SPD) 1919–32, persecution as a Jew and a Social Democrat from 1933 to 1945, city council of Berlin 1946 -1951, MP from 1952 to 1961, member of the Central Council of Jews in Germany
 Hermann von Bönninghausen (1888–1919), athlete and Olympian in 1908 and 1912
 Josef "Jupp" Elting (born 1944), football keeper from 1962 to 1980 at 1. FC Bocholt, then in the Bundesliga from 1964 to 1974 with Schalke 04 and 1. FC Kaiserslautern
 Karl-Heinz Petzinka (born 1956), architect and Rector of the Kunstakademie Düsseldorf
 Jutta Niehaus (born 1964), cyclist
 Peter Hyballa (born 1975), football coach, currently at Dunajská Streda
 Carlo Ljubek (born 1976), actor, currently engagement at Cologne Theatre
 Benjamin Weigelt (born 1982), footballer, currently at Rot-Weiß Oberhausen
 Simon Terodde (born 1988), professional football player, currently at Schalke 04
 Phil Bauhaus (born 1994), professional road race cyclist, currently with Team Sunweb
Benjamin Henrichs (born 1997), professional football player, currently at RB Leipzig

International relations
Since 1978 students from Bocholt have participated in an exchange program with students from Canton, Massachusetts.

Twin towns – sister cities

Bocholt is twinned with:
 Aurillac, France
 Bocholt, Belgium
 Rossendale, England, United Kingdom

Friendly cities
Bocholt has friendly relations with:
 Akmenė, Lithuania
 Wuxi, China

See also

 Bocholt Cross

References

External links

  
 Map of Bocholt 

 
Borken (district)
Members of the Hanseatic League